Parkview School District is a school district serving areas of Rock County, Wisconsin. The district includes the villages of Orfordville and Footville, as well as the towns of Spring Valley, Plymouth, Magnolia and Newark.

Schools
Parkview Primary School
Parkview Elementary School
Parkview Jr./Sr. High School

External links
Parkview School District website
District information from the State of Wisconsin
District information from GreatSchools.net

References

School districts in Wisconsin
Education in Rock County, Wisconsin